Chisato Moritaka Concert Tour '92: Live Rock Alive Complete is a live video by Japanese singer-songwriter Chisato Moritaka. Recorded live at the Nakano Sun Plaza in Nakano, Tokyo on September 30, 1992, the video was released on November 23, 2022, by Warner Music Japan to commemorate Moritaka's 35th anniversary. It is a digitally remastered version of the live video originally released on February 25, 1993, with two additional songs and previously unreleased footage. The video is offered on Blu-ray and DVD formats; each with a two-disc audio CD version of the concert. A limited edition Blu-ray boxed set includes a Blu-ray copy of the original 1993 cut, a digitally remastered version of the Rock Alive CD, a photo booklet, a miniature reprint of the original tour pamphlet, a sticker sheet, and a flyer.

The video peaked at No. 19 on Oricon's Blu-ray chart.

Track listing 
Blu-ray/DVD

* Previously unreleased track.

Personnel 
 Chisato Moritaka – vocals, guitar
 The Janet Jacksons
 Yasuaki Maejima – keyboards, backing vocals
 Shin Kōno – keyboards, guitar, backing vocals
 Hiroyoshi Matsuo – guitar, backing vocals
 Masafumi Yokoyama – bass, backing vocals
 Toshihiro Tsuchiya – drums

with

 Shinichi Baba as the Student on "The Blue Blues"

Charts

References

External links 
  (Chisato Moritaka)
  (Warner Music Japan)

2022 live albums
2022 video albums
Chisato Moritaka video albums
Japanese-language live albums
Japanese-language video albums
Live video albums
Warner Music Japan albums
Albums recorded at Nakano Sun Plaza